Fabio Parasecoli (born in 1964) is an Italian academic and author, whose work focusses on the intersectionality of food, media and politics. He is currently a Food Studies professor at NYU Steinhardt. 

Parasecoli was born in Rome, and studied contemporary Chinese history for two years in Beijing University under a graduate fellowship before obtaining a PhD in agricultural sciences with a focus on gender and nutrition from Hohenheim University. He moved to the United States of America in 1998, initially working as the US correspondent for Gambero Rosso. He later worked as a professor at The New School, before moving to NYU Steinhardt. His 2008 book Bite Me! Food in Popular Culture was praised as "a necessary addition to the analysis of the popular and the edible". Although his writing style has been criticised as being excessively complicated  his books Food and Gastronativism: Food, Identity, Politics present an accessible style for the general public. In 2018, Parasecoli started a three year long research project examining the renewed interest towards traditional, local and regional food in Poland through a grant received from the National Science Centre. In 2022 he received a grant from the Spanish Ministry of Culture and Sport for a project on cultural heritage and design.

Books 
 Libano: Ritorno al Paradiso (1996). Liber Internazionale Press 
 Food Culture in Italy (2004). Greenwood Publishing Group 
 Bite Me: Food in Popular Culture (2008). Bloomsbury Publishing 
 Al Dente: A History of Food in Italy (2014). Reaktion Books 
 Feasting Our Eyes: Food Films and Cultural Identity in the United States (2016; co-authored with Laura Lindenfeld). Columbia University Press 
 Knowing Where It Comes From: Labeling Traditional Foods to Compete in a Global Market (2017). University of Iowa Press 
 Food (The MIT Press Essential Knowledge series) (2019). MIT Press 
 Global Brooklyn: Designing food experiences in world cities (2021; co-edited with Mateusz Halawa). MIT Press 
 Gastronativism: Food, Identity, Politics (2022). Columbia University Press

References

External links 
Parasecoli's personal website
Food and Popular Culture with Fabio Parasecoli. March 11, 2011. The New School. via YouTube.

1965 births
Living people
Sapienza University of Rome alumni
Steinhardt School of Culture, Education, and Human Development faculty
Italian academics
New York University faculty